Alejandro Organista Orozco (born 2 June 2000) is a Mexican professional footballer who plays as an attacking midfielder for Liga de Expansión MX team Tapatío, on loan from Liga MX club Guadalajara.

Career statistics

Club

References

External links
 
 
 

Living people
2000 births
Mexican footballers
Association football midfielders
Atlético San Luis footballers
C.D. Guadalajara footballers
Liga de Expansión MX players
Liga MX players
Footballers from Guadalajara, Jalisco